Below is a list of diplomatic missions during World War II that were undertaken by the allied forces.
 Arcadia (1941) — Washington Conference between President of the United States Franklin D. Roosevelt and Prime Minister of the United Kingdom Winston Churchill
 Argonaut (1945) — linked sequence of conferences
 Cricket (1945) — pre-Yalta Conference at Malta between Franklin D. Roosevelt and Winston Churchill 
 Magneto (1945) — Yalta Conference between Franklin D. Roosevelt, Premier of the Soviet Union Joseph Stalin and Winston Churchill
 Eureka (1943) — conference between Franklin D. Roosevelt, Winston Churchill and Joseph Stalin at Tehran
 Octagon (1944) — conference between Franklin D. Roosevelt and Winston Churchill at Quebec City to discuss Morgenthau Plan
 Quadrant (1943) — conference between Franklin D. Roosevelt and Winston Churchill at Quebec City
 Riviera (1941) — Franklin D. Roosevelt/Winston Churchill conference at Placentia Bay, Newfoundland
 Sextant 1 (1943) — conference between Franklin D. Roosevelt, Winston Churchill and Premier of China Chiang Kai-shek at Cairo
 Sextant 2 (1943) — conference between Franklin D. Roosevelt, Winston Churchill and President of Turkey İsmet İnönü at Cairo
 Symbol (1943) — conference between Franklin D. Roosevelt, Winston Churchill and the leader of the Free French, Charles de Gaulle, at Casablanca
 Terminal (1945) — conference between Franklin D. Roosevelt, Winston Churchill, Clement Attlee and Joseph Stalin at Potsdam
 Trident (1943) — third Washington conference between Franklin D. Roosevelt and Churchill

See also
List of World War II military operations

World War II
Politics of World War II